The Metal Powder Company Limited (MEPCO) is situated at Thirumangalam in Madurai district in southern part of Tamil Nadu, India. Established in 1961 and commercial production started in 1965. It is engaged in manufacture of non-ferrous metal powders of various kinds like aluminium, copper, zinc, cobalt, tungsten, tin etc. Also they manufacture alloys of copper, zinc etc.

They sell to a wide range of industries like fireworks, paint, printing ink, mining explosives, ordnance, space, cutting tools, brake linings etc.

The turnover exceeded Rs.200cr in the financial year 2007 - 08.

The Mepco Schlenk trust is the social welfare trust of this company which has formed the prestigious Mepco Schlenk Engineering College at Sivakasi.

References

 The Economics Times, 9 May 2002, 1353 hrs IST, PTI, Mepco buys back shares from IDBI

External links
 Metal Powder Company Limited (MEPCO) Official site

Metal companies of India
Companies based in Tamil Nadu
Economy of Madurai
Manufacturing companies established in 1961
Indian companies established in 1961
1961 establishments in Madras State